The 'Holy Trinity' Orthodox Cathedral is a Romanian Orthodox cathedral in Arad, in the Crișana region of western Romania. It is the main cathedral of the episcopal see of Arad, currently headed by Timotei, Archbishop of Arad.

History
The cornerstone of the new cathedral was laid by the bishop, Timotei in November 1991. Proper construction efforts started in 1992, when the work started on consolidating the ground and the foundation of the new church. Construction lasted until 2006, when the last exterior works were being made and the large front icon was completed.

Long before construction has ended, due to the specific of the church, bells were brought in from a foundry in Innsbruck, Austria. With a summed mass of 6.56 tons, respectively 4050, 1070, 745, 450 and 250 kg for the five bells, they were mounted in December 2003. In 2006 the cathedral had 4 golden crosses mounted upon its domes. The three small crosses measured 3,5 meters each and the large one was 7,30 meters high.

Inauguration
On the feast of Saint Nicholas, in 2008, the cathedral was inaugurated by the Patriarch of All Romania, Daniel. An impressive gathering of clergy and believers took part in the blessing of the church and its inauguration. As the cathedral has been built, a temporary altar above the ground, but at the same time underneath the floor of the nave and subsequently under the main altar was used for celebrating liturgy, was blessed at the same time during the inauguration and kept as a permanent installation.

See also
List of largest Orthodox cathedrals
Church of the Nativity of Saint John the Baptist (Arad, Romania), the previous cathedral

References

Romanian Orthodox cathedrals in Romania
Buildings and structures in Arad, Romania
Churches completed in 2008
20th-century Eastern Orthodox church buildings